Natalie is a  town in Northumberland County, Pennsylvania, United States. It is classified as a "community designated place" (census class code U6) meaning it is neither a census-designated place nor a place having a federally recognized name.

References

Populated places in Northumberland County, Pennsylvania